Villaverde is a parish (administrative division), a municipality within the province and autonomous community of Asturias, in northern Spain.

The population is 104 (INE 2011). The postal code is 33890.

Villages and hamlets
 Abaniella
 Lantigo
 Peruyeda
 Santa Eulalia
 El Valle
 Villaverde (Viḷḷaverde)

External links
 Allande 

Parishes in Allande